Alan W. Archer (born 1930) is a mycologist and taxonomist. He is currently (January 2021) an honorary research associate at Royal Botanic Gardens Sydney.  He uses chemotaxonomy as well as morphological features in taxonomy and to devise keys, most recently for the genus Pertusaria in the Australasia region.

During his career he has characterised and revised over 100 fungal taxa. He is an authority on the family Graphidaceae from the Australia - Pacific region and characterised Carbacanthographis salazinica and Phaeographis salazinica. An advanced search of the Mycobank database shows that he has authored some 101 fungi taxa, including Pertusaria xylophyes. (See also Taxa named by Alan W. Archer.)

The standard author abbreviation A.W.Archer is used to indicate this person as the author when citing a botanical name.

Some publications

References 

1930 births
Living people
20th-century Australian botanists
Australian lichenologists
Australian mycologists
Australian taxonomists